Phutthachan ( Buḍḍhācārya, literally "Senior Master", and formerly  Buddhācārya, literally "Awakened Master") is an ecclesiastical title given to senior members of the Thai sangha, the community of Buddhist priests of Thailand.

History
In the Ayutthaya Kingdom, the title Buddhācārya was preserved for Buddhist monks who were patriarchs of the sect of araṇyavāsī (literally "forest dwellers").

In 2394  (1851/52 ), the title Buddhācārya was modified as Buḍḍhācārya by King Rama IV who gave it to Son, the abbot of Wat Saket.

Title holders

Holders of this title include:

 Somdej Toh (17 April 1788 – 22 June 1872)
 Somdet Kiaw (3 March 1928 – 10 August 2013)

References

Thai Buddhist titles